Liolaemus senguer is a species of lizard in the family Liolaemidae. It is native to Argentina.

References

senguer
Reptiles described in 2005
Reptiles of Argentina
Endemic fauna of Argentina
Taxa named by Cristian Simón Abdala